Udea orbicentralis is a moth in the family Crambidae. It was described by Hugo Theodor Christoph in 1881. It is found in the Russian Far East (Primorsky Krai, Amur), Korea, western China and Japan.

The wingspan is 19–25 mm.

References

orbicentralis
Moths described in 1881